Polessky District is an administrative district (raion), one of the fifteen in Kaliningrad Oblast, Russia. As a municipal division, it is incorporated as Polessky Municipal District. It is located in the center of the oblast. Its administrative center is the town of Polessk. As of the 2010 Census, the total population of the district was 19,205, with the population of Polessk accounting for 39.5% of that number.

Geography
The district is situated in the center of the oblast, with the Curonian Lagoon to the north. The Deyma River, a branch of the Pregolya, flows through the district. Near Polessk, the Polessk Canal connects the Pregolya and the Neman Rivers, crossing a bog.

History
The district was established on April 7, 1946 as Labiausky District. It was given its present name on September 7, 1946.

Economy
Economy is focused on fishery and agriculture. The railway line from Kaliningrad to Sovetsk, and the Kaliningrad–Guryevsk–Polessk–Bolshakovo road lead parallel with the shore of the Curonian Lagoon.

References

Notes

Sources

Districts of Kaliningrad Oblast
States and territories established in 1946